Hasle is a neighborhood in the borough of Grünerløkka in Oslo, Norway.

It is served by the station Hasle on the Oslo Metro. Facilities include a church and the national tennis centre of Norway.

References

Neighbourhoods of Oslo